Founders Tower is a tower in Magdalen College, Oxford, England.

It is the second-highest tower in the college, after the Great Tower. It is very slightly taller than St Swithun's Tower, which faces it across St John's Quad.

Founders Tower houses the entrance to the Old Library, and sits above the main entrance to the Cloisters. Despite the views of the college from the top of the tower, access is restricted.

See also 

 Magdalen Great Tower (Magdalen College)
 Tom Tower (Christ Church)

References 

 Jennifer Sherwood and Nikolaus Pevsner, The Buildings of England: Oxfordshire. .

Magdalen College, Oxford
Towers in Oxford
Buildings and structures of the University of Oxford